USS LST-179 was a  in the United States Navy during World War II.

Construction and career 
LST-179 was laid down on 7 February 1943 at Missouri Valley Bridge and Iron Co., Evansville, Indiana. Launched on 30 May 1943 and commissioned on 3 July 1943.

During World War II, LST-179 was assigned to the Asiatic-Pacific theater. She took part in the Gilbert Islands operations from 13 November to 8 December 1943.

She was destroyed and sunk during the West Loch disaster alongside 5 other LSTs at Pearl Harbor on 21 May 1944. On that day, she was moored with LST-205, LST-225, LST-274, LST-43, LST-69, LST-353, and LST-39. No crew members were lost aboard the ship during that disaster.

LST-179 was struck from the Navy Register on 18 July 1944.

In 1945, she was raised but deemed too expensive to be repaired thus she was towed out to sea and sunk again as a target ship for torpedoes.

Awards 
LST-179 have earned the following awards:

American Campaign Medal
Asiatic-Pacific Campaign Medal (1 battle star)
World War II Victory Medal

Citations

Sources 
 
 
 
 

World War II amphibious warfare vessels of the United States
Ships built in Evansville, Indiana
1943 ships
LST-1-class tank landing ships of the United States Navy
Ships sunk as targets
Maritime incidents in May 1944